The 2017 Southern Thailand floods are the biggest floods in over 30 years in the southern part of the country during the regional annual monsoon season, which is distinct from other parts of the nation and mirrors that the Malay Peninsula. Between December 2016 and January 2017, Southern Thailand experienced a devastating flood disaster. The bulk of the 15 provinces in Southern Thailand were affected, and this flood event stood out from earlier flood catastrophes due to the massive, long-term damage it produced. Since around December 31, 2016, there have been abnormally significant rains for that time of year. According to the Meteorological Department, thunderstorms and strong winds continued to affect the southern regions. The amount of water in the Nan River, which flows through the Taphan Hin and Bang Mun Nak districts of the capital city of Phichit Province, rose at an alarming rate. This is the second deadly flood in a month in southern Thailand. The Department of Disaster Prevention and Mitigation (DDPM) of the Ministry of Interior estimates that there were 95 fatalities and 1,815,618 total victims in the 13 prefectures that were affected by the disaster. 4,314 road segments, 348 bridges, 126 weirs, and 2 sluices were among the destroyed infrastructure items. The extensive area of heavy rain and the simultaneous occurrence of numerous dam breaks severely damaged the local logistics infrastructure. While gum and palm oil help some regions' economies, others, like the extremely underdeveloped territory bordering Malaysia, are socioeconomically unstable. In these situations, the government made efforts in disaster restoration works by utilizing the military in a way that had never before been done for this purpose. Some 120 billion baht (US$4 billion) in damages are foreseen as of mid-January, much of this due to lost production in agriculture tourism and infrastructure. Rubber supply is particularly impacted. Particularly hard hit are palm and rubber plantations.

Background 
Many of Thailand's southern regions have had to deal with catastrophic flooding disasters since the end of 2016 as a result of the area's persistent rains. Prachuabkirikan, Chumphon, Ranong, Surat Thani, Nakhon Si Thammarat, Krabi, Trang, Phatthalung, Songkhla, Yala, Pattani, and Narathiwat are the 12 provinces that faced damages. Many highways and railways were also disrupted by the flood, which stopped transit to the south. Koh Samui in the province of Surat Thani was among the economic sectors damaged by the storm. Aid was being delivered to the communities by the government and private citizens. In five provinces (Yala, Ranong, Narathiwat, Pattani, and Krabi), the flooding situation slowly improved. However, residents of the flooded provinces continued to exercise caution and make preparations for the incoming rainfall over the next couple of weeks.

Causes 
The flood in southern Thailand in 2016–17 was brought on by the northeast monsoon, which transports humidity from the sea to land and causes persistently heavy rainfall in that region. Due to the overwhelming amount of rain, the drainage system was unable to release the water into the sea hence the floods.

Flooding timeline 
Since 1 January 2017, up to 25,000 people were forced from their homes as floods hit parts of the south after heavy rains hit parts of northeast Malaysia. 64 districts spanning the provinces of Nakhon Si Thammarat, Trang, Phatthalung, Songkhla, Pattani, Yala, Narathiwat, and Surat Thani were still under water as of January 6, according to DDPM Deputy Director-General Korpchai Boonorana. Authorities kept an eye on the situation and delivered disaster help when required. Between January 16 and January 26, 2017, more torrential rain fell.

Flood events 
6th Jan 2017: Nakhon Sri Thammarat airport was closed for 2 days due to the paralyzed.

6th Jan 2017: Surat Thani train station became the terminal station for the southern railroad.

6th Jan 2017: Flooding in Phatthalung caused 3 deaths. 11 Districts were affected by flood. There was also a landslide in some areas.

8th Jan 2017: Continuous rainfall caused a 20 cm-high flood in downtown Krabi.

12th Jan 2017: High flood water in many areas caused the trains heading to Trang to stop the service.

14th Jan 2017: Seven southern provinces are still flooded. Meanwhile, floods were gone in 5 provinces which are Yala, Ranong, Narathiwat, Pattani and Krabi.

24th Jan 2017: Department of Disaster Prevention and Mitigation (DDPM) reported that 96 people had died as a result of the floods and around 1.8 million people from 590,000 families have been affected. The floodwaters have severely affected 2,336 schools, 70 government buildings, 348 bridges, and 4,314 roadways. 530,000 dwellings had suffered flash flooding by the middle of January.

31st Jan 2017: In the three provinces of Nakorn Si Thammarat, Surat Thani, and Phatthalung, only 6 districts out of 15 000 households were still damaged by floods as of January 31, 2017, according to DDPM.

Damage 
Flood water affected twelve provinces, and landslides and flash floods occurred often. As of 17 January 2017, 1,135 roads, 5,498 communities in 119 Districts, 20 official locations, and 43 recorded fatalities were documented. The death toll increased to 96 by 2 February 2017, according to Thailand’s Department of Disaster Prevention and Mitigation (DDPM) in flooding that affected 12 southern provinces in the country from early January. Koh Samui, Khanom, and Pak Panang in the province of Surat Thani were among the economically significant places that were impacted by the flood. Cattle feed is in short supply due to agricultural devastation caused by floodwaters. Rescue teams were dispatched to the area. In order to force flood water into the sea, the navy has assisted the boats.

In January 2017, several days of torrential downpour inundated most of southern Thailand. Although floods brought on by the monsoon are frequent in the area, the rainy season typically ends around November.

On January 9, 2017, an image of a flooded area close to the Pra River was taken by the Operational Land Imager (OLI) on the Landsat 8 satellite. Flood water with silt makes up a large portion of the tan and yellow color of the terrain. The same region is depicted in the second shot on February 2, 2014, when the seas were lower.

According to Thai authorities, the downpour, which started on January 1, 2017, is some of the worst to hit Thailand in three decades. Infrastructure has been severely damaged, affecting more than 300,000 houses.

Impacts

Healthcare

Flood related diseases 
There were concerns over an increased risk of disease brought on by flooding. According to Yala province's public health officer Dr. Utitsak Harirattanakul, there were 365 cases of flood-related illness between January 19 and January 26, most of which were respiratory illnesses, food poisoning, red eyes, or dengue fever. The Ministry of Public Health of Thailand highlighted worries on February 1, 2017 about the potential spread of leptospirosis once the floods in the southern region have subsided. In the provinces of Krabi and Trang, 157 cases were documented since the year's commencement, and three people died from the illness.

Education 
The Ministry of Education reported that more than 41,000 pupils in 11 provinces in the South were severely affected by severe flooding. According to Boonrux Yodpheth, secretary-general of the Office of the Basic Education Commission, in addition to residences and farms, schools in 26 educational zones in those provinces were also severely impacted (Obec). The flash floods in Songkhla prompted the closure of at least two schools in the province's prominent commercial area, Hat Yai, for two days.

Economy 

Apart from the structural deterioration, farmland and supply yields were adversely affected. Major rubber plantations in southern Thailand provide a large portion of the nation's rubber supply. As a result of the floods, the estimated production for 2016–2017 was 10% lower. The continuous floods and persistent rain ruined close to 1 million rai of cropland. Over 990,000 rai were planting crops, 39,000 rai for animal farms, and 19,000 rai for grassland. According to Uthai Sonlucksub, president of the Natural Rubber Council of Thailand, southern Thailand is a significant rubber-producing region, and the floods hit this area at a difficult moment for farmers by disrupting infrastructure. He further added that since the demand exceeded supply, the price of rubber would inflate the following year. Both agricultural and non-agricultural industries saw decreased employment because of the economic recession, which diminished domestic consumption. However, the number of Chinese and Russian visitors increased. The University of the Thai Chamber of Commerce (UTCC) anticipated that the region's 3.2% economic growth would reduce by 1.2 percentage points. The damage is forecasted to lower the southern region's GDP growth from an earlier forecast 3.2% increase to merely 2% growth. 8.6% of the country's GDP is attributable to the south. The regional GDP predicts to have increased by 2.9% from the previous year to 1.13 trillion baht last year. A Department of Business Development study indicates that, in varying degrees, 43,000 enterprises have taken the brunt. Retail and agricultural companies are among the ones impacted. The impact of the flooding on the nation's GDP as a whole, according to Mr. Vachira, was anticipated to be minimal—only 0.1%, to be exact.

Infrastructure 

Due to torrential rain, the Khlong Pho Reservoir overflowed, resulting in flooding in the Uthai Thani province's Phai Khiao and Bo Yang sub-districts. According to reports, the water level in some areas reached up to 80 cm, destroying the roadways and jeopardizing various plantation activities. In all, 578,814 homes in 12,949 localities were impacted by flooding, resulting in 29 fatalities. Over 3 million rai of agricultural land, 14,097 fish ponds, 2,055 roads, and 4,129 dwellings were all affected. Meanwhile, the northern province of Tak, with at least 29 buildings in Ban Rom Klao Sahamit in tambon Khiri Rat of the Phrop Phra district, recorded severe flash floods due to heavy rainfall. The village's main road was covered in a deep layer of mud from the flooding, making it impassable. Several bridges on the country's primary north-south route were washed away in one instance of flash floods, causing a 200-kilometer traffic backup (125 miles). Numerous rivers, like the Ta Pi River, have inundated adjacent settlements and their barricades, forcing people to flee to higher land. From the overall damage, it's projected that infrastructure, including roads, railroads, bridges, and dwellings, will suffer damage worth 3.40 billion baht; agricultural, 8.1 billion baht; and companies and industry, primarily small and medium-sized organizations, 10.9 billion baht.

Tourism 

The devastating effects of massive floods have severely impacted Thailand's tourist sector. The second-largest economy in Southeast Asia, Thailand, depends heavily

on tourism, which employs around 15% of the labor force and accounts for roughly 6% of GDP. The renowned islands of Ko Samui and Ko Pha Ngan are among those hit by the unseasonal weather at this time of year, which is peak travel season in Thailand. The Andaman Coast has also witnessed rain and large waves, with Krabi and Trang among the regions suffering the brunt of the monsoon rains. The Gulf Coast of Thailand has suffered the worst weather. Additionally, flooding has damaged cultural heritage sites and restricted access to tourist locations. In several southern provinces, transportation has been affected by the flood waters, with the road, rail, and aviation services all suffering. The airport in Nakhon Si Thammarat has been temporarily closed because of flooding. Due to floods on the railway in Prachuap Khiri Khan this week, train services between Bangkok and the south have been delayed, resulting in trains to the south stopping at Hua Hin (one of the top tourist destinations). Until the situation improved, ferry, speedboat, and longtail boat services between the islands along the Gulf Coast were also discontinued. Despite the nation's high unemployment rate brought on by severe floods and tropical storms, the number of international visitors increased significantly. Chinese visitors, in particular, climbed dramatically, helped by temporary initiatives to reduce and waive visa fees and this year's Chinese New Year fell in January (last year was in February). The number of tourists from Europe and Russia has also been steadily increasing. Increased domestic and international flights were evidence of this.

Response

Local

NHSO offers South flood victims temporary access to free medical care 
The National Health Security Office (NHSO) made the decision to make free medical care available to flood victims in the South, which was known as the "gold card" healthcare program in other regions. The NHSO meeting, presided over by Public Health Minister Piyasakol Sakolsatayadorn, decided that for the time being, inhabitants of disaster-affected areas can receive free medical care through the universal healthcare program in hospitals to which they are not affiliated. The action is intended to make medical care more accessible to locals in places where local hospitals are inaccessible due to flooding. The NHSO also asked for an emergency funding to aid hospitals that have been impacted by flooding.

Navy sends ships and personnel to aid flood victims in the south 
In order to assist flood victims in the southern region, the Navy has sent ships, aircraft, and officers, with the first ship scheduled to arrive in Nakhon Sri Thammarat on January 8. To help the flood victims, the Navy sent 20 thruster ships, officers, and landing craft to Nakhon Sri Thammarat. Along with the transport ship HTMS Angthong with a helipad, the thruster ships have departed from Phra Chulachomklao Navy Garage in Samut Prakarn province with supplies and additional personnel. The HTMS Angthong operated as a field hospital, kitchen, and command center for food and relief supplies. Helicopters were used in the effort to move supplies from the ship to the inundated areas.

Princess Sirindhorn backed a plan to supply hay to livestock ranches impacted by floods 
The southern provinces of Surat Thani, Phatthalung, and Songkhla received hay thanks to a scheme backed by Her Royal Highness Princess Maha Chakri Sirindhorn. Representatives from the Provincial Division of Veterinary Inspection and Quarantine, the Provincial Livestock Department, and the Provincial Bureau of Animal Nutrition Development joined Weerachai Wirotesaengarun of Satun to officially launch the occasion. To help farmers affected by the floods, the initiative sent out 10 trucks each holding 2,000 bushels of hay. According to Mr. Weerachai, Princess Maha Chakri Sirindhorn worked with Chulalongkorn University and the Livestock Department to create an animal feed development center and make animal feed. The facility includes technological improvements in feed development and provides farmers with animal feed as necessary.

PM: The government rushed to help the flood-affected south 
The government's commitment to aiding people in need, particularly southern citizens affected by the flood catastrophe, was reaffirmed by Prime Minister Gen Prayut Chan-o-cha on 14 January 2017. The well-being of those affected by the floods in the south was a concern for HM King Maha Vajiralongkorn Bodindradebayavarangkun and other Royal Family members, the Prime Minister claimed. The flood victims received relief packages and other requirements from His Majesty. The majority of the flooded districts were unreachable owing to the intense flooding, but the prime minister claimed that both the central and local governments were working around the clock to supply cooked food there.

Gen Prayut stated that the government raised the crisis' intensity from level 2 to level 3 in response to the circumstance. Additionally, by designating level 3, it permitted the use of national and regional processes, allowing all relevant agencies to work closely together to meet the requirements of the victims. In order to deal with the issue, more than 4,000 officers, 671 flat-bottomed and carbon fiber boats, 142 trucks, 107 water thrusters, 200 water pumping devices, 16 power generators, and 5 helicopters were dispatched to the flooded areas.

International

Thailand receives additional assistance from the US for disaster risk reduction 
On February 16, 2017, Glyn T. Davies, the U.S. ambassador to Thailand, announced an additional $500,000 to support disaster risk reduction initiatives that would assist Thai communities and schools be better prepared for floods and other natural disasters. With this support from USAID, Save the Children, the project's implementing partner, will be able to expand its current work on disaster risk reduction in Yala, Narathiwat, Pattani, and now Nakhon Si Thammarat, the province most severely affected by the recent flooding.

While visiting families who had been affected by the flooding last month, Ambassador Davies remarked, "The United States stands in solidarity and friendship with the Thai people as they deal with the aftermath of the storm." "We will never forget Thailand's assistance following Hurricane Katrina, which devastated New Orleans and the surrounding communities in 2005. When a tragedy strikes, being ready for the unexpected can save lives and hasten recovery. We think that by providing this support, individuals would be able to prepare for emergencies by knowing where to go and how to safeguard their property and selves."

South Thailand flood victims receive financial assistance from Malaysian businesspeople 
Money has been given to the victims of the disastrous floods that ravaged southern Thailand in January by a group of businessmen from Malaysia. Sakon Chantharak, the governor of Nakhon Si Thammarat, welcomed a group of businesspeople from Malaysia's state of Kelantan in the first week of March 2017. They gave him 300,000 baht to use for repairing and upgrading homes that had been harmed by the floods.

Mitigation and relief efforts

Thai Red Cross Society 
Following the calamity, the Thai Red Cross Society, led by Her Majesty Queen Sirikit, has offered assistance in the devastated districts. Relief kits were provided with food, water, and necessities. Families in ten severely impacted provinces—Sakon Nakhon, Ubon Ratchathani, Sisaket, Lopburi, Roi Et, Surin, Nakhon Ratchasima, Phichit, Chaiyaphum, and Mukdahan—have received 8,432 relief kits totaling more than 8,432,000 baht.

Disaster Prevention and Mitigation Department (DDPM) 
The Disaster Prevention and Mitigation Department (DDPM) urged officials in the provinces where the water had receded to conduct thorough damage assessments so the government could launch post-flood assistance programs accordingly. The DDPM also contacted responsible agencies in the affected areas about providing assistance measures. As a significant amount of runoff from other flooded regions was anticipated to flow into the province through the Moon River, irrigation officials constructed 22 water jet propulsion drives over the Moon River at a bridge in Ubon Ratchathani to hasten the rate of discharge into the Mekong River. The government intended to review response initiatives and warning systems for future catastrophes and prevention actions to ensure that they are well prepared for what is not an unusual occurrence in Thailand.

Military, Government and NGOs 
Much of the flood water was drained, and relief activities in impacted regions were carried out owing to the combined efforts of the military, government, and non-governmental organizations (NGOs) operating in the sector. A total of 50 jet propulsion devices and more than 70 water pumps were built to dump water into the sea, and nearby army facilities provided vehicles and personnel for rescue efforts. Many homes were also moved to avoid damages from further flooding. The anticipated number of farm animals that have been evacuated includes 897,000; 14,000 animals have gotten medical attention, and 480,000 kg of animal feed have been supplied.

Agricultural Research Development Agency (ARDA) 
Thailand's Prasang, Cahiburi, and Vieng-Sra Districts received emergency assistance from ADRA Thailand. Initial evaluations by Phuket Mission Hospital revealed that food and water were the most crucial requirements of the impacted populations. ADRA Thailand and Phuket Mission Hospital declared that they would distribute food help to the following areas: Sai Khueng, Prasang District; Songprak, Chaiburi District; and Tung Luang, Vieng Sra District. The response was divided into two distributions and staged. The first distribution was made to 218 households in Prasang & Chaiburi Districts, while the second was to 260 families in Vieng-Sra District. Working with the Mission Hospital and local authorities, the locations chosen for ADRA involvement were determined by narrowing down the sub-districts and following villages most affected by floods. Village leaders of the pre-selected communities recommended families to get assistance based on their assessment of whose dwellings were in the poorest locations and their selection of the most deserving candidates.

See also
2010 Thailand Floods
2011 Southern Thailand floods
2011 Thailand floods
2013 Southeast Asian floods
2014-15 floods in Southeast Asia and South Asia

References

Southern Thailand floods
Floods in Thailand
Southern Thailand floods
2016 in Thailand
Southern Thailand floods